The Polkowice-Sieroszowice mine is a large mine in the west of Poland near Polkowice and Sieroszowice, Polkowice County, 350 km south-west of the capital, Warsaw. Polkowice-Sieroszowice represents one of the largest copper and silver reserve in Poland having estimated reserves of 387 million tonnes of ore grading 2.65% copper and 54 g/tonnes silver. In 2018 the mine produced over 196,000 tonnes of copper and over 428 tonnes of silver.

References

External links 
 Official site

Copper mines in Poland
Polkowice County